A Step Toward Tomorrow is a 1996 drama film directed by Deborah Reinisch and starring Judith Light as a divorcee mother of paralyzed son. The film also starred Tom Irwin as neurosurgeon to help get him an experimental spinal-cord operation. The film also had special appearance by Alfre Woodard and a brief cameo by Christopher Reeve.

Cast
 Judith Light as Anna Lerner
 Tom Irwin as Dr. David Decker
 Kendall Cunningham as Georgie Lerner
 Tim Redwine as Ben Lerner
 Christopher Reeve as Denny Gabriel
 Alfre Woodard as Dr. Sandlin
 Brad Dourif as Kirby
 Nick Searcy as Jim
 Lee Norris as Perry

Reception
Judith Light's performance drew critical praise. John Voorhees from The Seattle Times "Judith Light is wholly believable as a fiercely loving divorced mother trying desperately to find help for her younger son, paralyzed after a diving accident. She tracks down a doctor and a clinic she feels holds out hope - only to find her health insurance doesn't cover the expensive operation that is needed. But that description is only the bare bones of "A Step Toward Tomorrow," which also has romance, humor and some mystery, as well, thanks to Tom Nursall and Harris Goldberg's solid script and Deborah Reinisch's sensitive direction. In addition to Light, who has never been better, there's a terrific performance by Tim Redwine, as the injured boy's older, caring brother, and by Tom Irwin, who seems an unlikely hero but is all the more convincing because of it. Kendall Cunningham is fine as the injured boy and Brad Dourif and Alfre Woodard score points in smaller roles."

The film received two nominations at the 18th Youth in Film Awards.

References

External links
 
 

1996 drama films
Hallmark Hall of Fame episodes
CBS network films
1996 films
1990s English-language films
Films shot in North Carolina